The Paracatu River is a river of Minas Gerais state in southeastern Brazil. It joins the São Francisco River just 12 km north of the mouth of its much larger namesake the Paracatu River on the opposite bank.

See also
 List of rivers of Minas Gerais

References
 Map from Ministry of Transport
 Rand McNally, The New International Atlas, 1993.

Rivers of Minas Gerais